A vulvar disease is a particular abnormal, pathological condition that affects part or all of the vulva. Several pathologies are defined. Some can be prevented by vulvovaginal health maintenance.

Vulvar cancer

Vulvar cancer accounts for about 5% of all gynecological cancers and typically affects women in later life. Five-year survival rates in the United States are around 70%.

Symptoms of vulvar cancer include itching, a lump or sore on the vulva which does not heal and/or grows larger, and sometimes discomfort/pain/swelling in the vulval area. Treatments include vulvectomy – removal of all or part of the vulva.

Vulvo-perineal localization of dermatologic disorders
Systemic disorders may be localized in the vulvo-perineal region.

 In Langerhans cell histiocytosis, lesions initially are erythematous, purpuric papules and they then become scaly, crusted and sometimes confluent.
 In Kawasaki disease, an erythematous, desquamating perineal rash may occur in the second week of symptom onset, almost at the same time as palmoplantar desquamation.
 Acrodermatitis enteropathica is a biochemical disorder of zinc metabolism.
Diaper dermatitis in infancy

Blemishes and cysts
 Epidermal cysts
 Angiomas
 Moles
 Freckles
 Lentigos
 Scars
 Scarification
 Vitiligo
 Tattoos
 Hypertrophy
 Sinus pudoris
 Bartholin's cyst
 Skene's duct cyst, a paraurethral cyst

Infections
 Candidiasis (thrush)
 Bacterial vaginosis (BV)
 Genital warts, due to human papilloma virus (HPV)
 Molluscum contagiosum
 Herpes simplex (genital herpes)
 Herpes zoster (shingles)
 Tinea cruris (fungus)
 Hidradenitis suppurativa
 Infestations with pinworms (rare), scabies and lice.

Inflammatory diseases
 Eczema/Dermatitis
 Lichen simplex (chronic eczema)
 Psoriasis
 Lichen sclerosus
 Lichen planus
 zoon's vulvitis (zoon's balanitis in men)
 Pemphigus vulgaris
 Pemphigoid (mucous membrane pemphigoid, cicatricial pemphigoid, bullous pemphigoid)

Pain syndromes
 Vulvodynia and vulvular vestibulitis
 Vaginismus

Ulcers
 Aphthous ulcer
 Behcet's Disease

Developmental disorders
 Septate vagina
 Vaginal opening extremely close to the urethra or anus
 An imperforate hymen
 Various stages of genital masculinization including fused labia, an absent or partially formed vagina, urethra located on the clitoris.
 Hermaphroditism

Tumoral and hamartomatous diseases 
Hemangiomas and vascular dysplasia may involve the perineal region
 Infantile perianal pyramidal protrusion

Other
 Vulvar Lymphangioma
 Paget's disease of the vulva
 Vulvar intraepithelial neoplasia (VIN)
 Bowen's disease
 Bowenoid papulosis
 Vulvar varicose veins
 Labial adhesions
 Perineodynia (perineal pain)
 Desquamative Inflammatory Vaginitis (DIV)
 Childbirth tears and Episiotomy related changes
Vestibulodynia

See also
Vaginal disease
list of ICD-10 codes

References

Gynaecology
Midwifery
Vulva